Archibald Carmichael may refer to:

 Archibald Hill Carmichael (1864–1947), U.S. Representative from  Alabama
 Archibald M. Carmichael (1882–1959), Canadian farmer, minister, teacher and politician
 A. D. Carmichael (Archibald Drummond Carmichael, 1859–?), industrial chemist